The highest-selling albums and extended plays (EPs) in Japan are ranked on the Oricon Weekly Chart, which is published by Oricon Style magazine. The data are compiled by Oricon based upon weekly physical album sales. In 2011, a total of 45 albums claimed the top position of the Oricon Weekly Chart.

Chart history

See also
2011 in music

References

External links
 Current Oricon Albums Chart

Number-one albums
Japan
2011